Marie Mahder (December 3, 1923 – January 27, 2001), best known by her stage name Sally Mansfield, was an American television character actress; she also had a few small roles in feature films including one with Dean Martin and Jerry Lewis.

Early career
Born in Oak Park, Illinois, Mansfield was a moppet radio star in Chicago, Illinois. Her father gave her the nickname "Sally". As a youth she joined the Actors Company of Chicago and the Children's Summer Theatre and studied at the Sherwood Music School. Coming to New York City in 1945, she voiced several radio roles for commercials and on soap operas and dramas. As a chorine with the Don Arden Dancers, she performed in revues in New York and in Las Vegas.

Moving to Hollywood, Mansfield met up with a talent scout for Paramount Pictures while she was in the Geller Workshop.  She landed a bit part in Forever Female (1953) as the secretary of Paul Douglas. She was a regular on the CBS Gunsmoke radio show in 1954.

Mansfield gained attention for modeling a sweater designed by Edith Head, which she wore when she entertained U.S. Army troops in Alaska and Japan. The sweater's back was padded with heat-producing chemicals, and this then-novel idea along with Mansfield's photo was widely syndicated. She modeled a two-piece bathing suit in Pose! The Picture Magazine, in March 1955.

Television career
Mansfield portrayed Connie on Bachelor Father and appeared on many popular TV shows in the 1950s and 1960s, including Death Valley Days, The Donna Reed Show, Hazel and The Andy Griffith Show, and The Phil Silvers Show. She was also an accomplished dancer, performed with the Don Arden Dancers in New York City and Las Vegas, and entertained US troops in Korea.

She is perhaps best remembered, however, for her 1954 role as spaceship navigator Vena Ray on the syndicated science fiction show Rocky Jones, Space Ranger. She was chosen from 300 who auditioned. Her character anticipated Nichelle Nichols' much more famous role as a female spaceship bridge officer on the 1960s television series Star Trek. The same year Mansfield carried the Miss Emmy torch at the Palladium during the sixth annual Academy of Television Arts & Sciences awards banquet.

Executive Producer, Guy V. Thayer Jr., signed Richard Crane and Mansfield to five year contracts for Rocky Jones, Space Ranger. One of the contract stipulations was that the still-single Mansfield would not marry and Crane would not divorce his wife of eight years.

Death
On January 28, 2001, Mansfield died of lung cancer in Westlake Village, California, at the age of 77.

Selected Television

References

External links

Sally Mansfield at MST3Kinfo.com

1923 births
2001 deaths
American female models
American female dancers
American film actresses
American television actresses
American radio actresses
Deaths from lung cancer in California
20th-century American actresses
20th-century American dancers